Boudjellil is a town in northern Algeria. It is part of Tazmalt District, post code 06018

Boudjellil is home to the community of Béni Mansour, where the regional Béni Mansour-Bejaïa line connects to the mainline Algiers-Skikda line.

Communes of Béjaïa Province